Eddington or Edington is a surname. Notable people with the surname include:

Arthur Stanley Eddington (1882–1944), English astrophysicist
E. Keith Eddington (1923–2007), American graphic designer
Gordon Edington (born 1945), English businessman
Patrick G. Eddington, CIA imagery analyst
Paul Eddington (1927–1995), English actor
Rod Eddington (born 1950), Australian businessman
Jonathon Edington (born 1976), American patent lawyer
Sophie Edington (born 1984), Australian swimmer
Stump Edington (1891–1969), American baseball player
William Edington (died 1366), English bishop and administrator

Fictional characters
Michael Eddington, a character in Star Trek: Deep Space Nine